Alumni House may refer to:

 Alumni House (College of William & Mary)
 Alumni House (University of Southern Mississippi), a Mississippi Landmark; see List of Mississippi Landmarks
 Alumni House (United States Naval Academy)
 Widney Alumni House, original building of the University of Southern California